Iron Well may refer to:

 Iron Well, Austria
 Pryor Avenue Iron Well, USA